Ancora is the 1981 debut LP of Italian singer Eduardo De Crescenzo following his triumph with the title song "Ancora" at the Festival di Sanremo. All the tracks are compositions with lyrics by Franco Migliacci and music by Claudio Mattone, which are co-published by Jubal/Easy Records Italian which also served as the album's production company. The album was recorded at "Quattro 1"  studios in Rome with the automatic mixer MCI JH-542 by sound engineer Luciano Torani, while the master was edited by Pietro Mannucci.

Track listing
Al piano bar di Susy – 4:30 (testo: Franco Migliacci – musica: Claudio Mattone)
Quando l'amore se ne va – 3:59 (testo: Franco Migliacci – musica: Claudio Mattone)
Alle sei di sera – 3:15 (testo: Franco Migliacci – musica: Claudio Mattone)
Uomini semplici – 3:36 (testo: Franco Migliacci – musica: Claudio Mattone)
Doppia vita – 3:24 (testo: Franco Migliacci – musica: Claudio Mattone)
Ancora – 3:27 (testo: Franco Migliacci – musica: Claudio Mattone)
Il treno – 3:35 (testo: Franco Migliacci – musica: Claudio Mattone)
Chitarra mia – 4:12 (testo: Claudio Mattone e Franco Migliacci – musica: Claudio Mattone)
Padre – 4:07 (testo: Franco Migliacci – musica: Claudio Mattone e Piero Pintucci)
Uomini semplici ([1]) – 1:20 (testo: Franco Migliacci – musica: Claudio Mattone)

References

1981 debut albums